Adrian John Desmond (born 1947) is an English writer on the history of science and author of books about Charles Darwin.

Life
He studied physiology at London University and went on to study history of science and vertebrate palaeontology at University College London before researching the history of vertebrate palaeontology at Harvard University. He was awarded a PhD in the area of the Victorian-period context of Darwinian evolution.

Desmond is an Honorary Research Fellow in the Biology Department at University College London.

Books
The Hot-blooded Dinosaurs: a revolution in palaeontology (1975)
The Ape's Reflexion (1979)
Archetypes and Ancestors (1982)
The Politics of Evolution: Morphology, medicine and reform in radical London (1989). This work won the Pfizer Award.
Darwin (1991) with James Moore. This work won the James Tait Black Prize, the Comisso Prize for biography in Italy, the Watson Davis Prize of the US History of Science Society and the Dingle Prize of the British Society for the History of Science.
Huxley: From Devil's Disciple to Evolution's High Priest (1999)
Charles Darwin (Very Interesting People) with Janet Browne & James Moore (2007)
Darwin's Sacred Cause: Race, Slavery, and the Quest for Human Origins with James Moore (2009)

Notes

1947 births
Living people
James Tait Black Memorial Prize recipients
Alumni of University College London
Academics of University College London
Charles Darwin biographers
Historians of biology